Varshadhare is a 2010 Kannada film directed by Vemagal Jagannatharao.

Cast 
Mithun Tejasvi as Rahul 
Payal Ghosh as Mythili 
Suraj Lokre as Niranjan 
 Sangeetha Shetty as Nirmala

Soundtrack

Reception

Critical response 

A critic from The Times of India scored the film at 3 out of 5 stars and says "While Mithun has given a good performance, Payal is simply superb. Sangeetha Shetty impresses. Ajanish Loknath's music passes the muster". A critic from Bangalore Mirror wrote  "The director weaves a story about a newly-wed housewife and her struggle to come to terms with a husband unwilling to consummate the marriage. Then there is the lecherous colleague of the husband who is also trying to scuttle a sensitive project. To make things interesting attempts to kill the team members developing a new software envelopes the narrative". Sify.com wrote "Music by Ajaneesh Lokanath is pathetic. Most of the tracks are not worth recalling. Besides, the background score for a thriller is disappointing. A highlight of the movie is the serene locations of the songs".

References

External links

2010 films
2010s Kannada-language films